Waterloo is a rural locality in the Bundaberg Region, Queensland, Australia.

Geography 
The northwest of the locality is in the Littabella National Park which extends into neighbouring Rosedale and Monduran. A small part of southwest of the locality is in the Monduran State Forest which extends into Monduran.

References 

Bundaberg Region
Localities in Queensland